Pinardville is a census-designated place (CDP) in the town of Goffstown, Hillsborough County, New Hampshire, United States. It is a suburban neighborhood adjacent to the city of Manchester. The population was 5,034 at the 2020 census. Pinardville has existed since 1906.

Geography
Pinardville is located in the southeastern part of Goffstown at  (42.996283, -71.508452). It is bordered to the east by the Manchester city line and to the north by the Piscataquog River. The campus of St. Anselm College is just outside the CDP, south of Saint Anselm Drive. The CDP extends west to the New Hampshire Route 114 bypass and then out South Mast Road as far as Henry Bridge Road.

Route 114 leads west out Mast Road  to Goffstown village and southeast  to New Hampshire Route 101 in Bedford. New Hampshire Route 114A follows Mast Road through the center of Pinardville and leads southeast  to South Main Street in the West Side of Manchester.

History 

In 1906, Edmond Pinard, a grocer by trade, developed real-estate holdings on the Manchester/Goffstown town line. Pinard was a French Canadian man who brought many French Canadians to the area. The area was known at the time as "Pinards Ville". It has grown substantially since then, but many of the original families still live in the area.

Demographics

As of the census of 2010, there were 4,780 people, 1,942 households, and 1,242 families residing in the CDP. There were 2,036 housing units, of which 94, or 4.6%, were vacant. The racial makeup of the CDP was 95.1% white, 1.5% African American, 0.2% Native American, 1.3% Asian, 0.04% Pacific Islander, 0.7% some other race, and 1.2% from two or more races. 2.5% of the population were Hispanic or Latino of any race.

Of the 1,942 households in the CDP, 28.8% had children under the age of 18 living with them, 46.8% were headed by married couples living together, 12.5% had a female householder with no husband present, and 36.0% were non-families. 28.0% of all households were made up of individuals, and 10.2% were someone living alone who was 65 years of age or older. The average household size was 2.36, and the average family size was 2.89.

19.6% of residents in the CDP were under the age of 18, 9.3% were from age 18 to 24, 28.8% were from 25 to 44, 28.7% were from 45 to 64, and 13.5% were 65 years of age or older. The median age was 39.4 years. For every 100 females, there were 85.4 males. For every 100 females age 18 and over, there were 83.7 males.

For the period 2011–15, the estimated median annual income for a household was $58,355, and the median income for a family was $76,490. Male full-time workers had a median income of $46,675 versus $43,721 for females. The per capita income for the CDP was $28,121. 10.0% of the population and 7.4% of families were below the poverty line, along with 11.2% of people under the age of 18 and 2.2% of people 65 or older.

References

External links
 Pinardville community website

Census-designated places in Hillsborough County, New Hampshire
Census-designated places in New Hampshire
Neighborhoods in New Hampshire
Goffstown, New Hampshire